This page documents the tornadoes and tornado outbreaks of 1980, primarily in the United States. Most tornadoes form in the U.S., although some events may take place internationally. Tornado statistics for older years like this often appear significantly lower than modern years due to fewer reports or confirmed tornadoes.

Events

Numbers for 1980 were below average, both in terms of number of tornadoes and number of fatalities; however, there were over 1,100 injuries related to tornadoes.

United States yearly total

January
There were 7 tornadoes in the US in January.

February
There were 11 tornadoes in the US in February.

March
There were 41 tornadoes in the US in March.

March 1

An F3 tornado struck Pompano Beach, Florida, killing one and injuring 33. This was last of only three F3/EF3 tornadoes to hit Broward County, Florida with the others occurring on April 10, 1956 and February 23, 1965.

April
There were 137 tornadoes in the US in April.

April 2–4

An outbreak of 17 tornadoes struck the Great Plains, Midwest, and Eastern United States starting with an F4 tornado that struck Baylor County, Texas. Overall, the outbreak injured four.

April 5
A rare strong F2 tornado injured one in California.

May
There were 203 tornadoes in the US in May.

May 13

A destructive F3 tornado tore through Downtown Kalamazoo, Michigan, killing five, injuring 79, and causing an estimated at $50 million in damage. The tornado was one of four damaging tornadoes on this day. There were five fatalities and 94 injuries.

June
There were 217 tornadoes in the US in June.

June 2–3

A two-day tornado outbreak caused widespread damage from North Dakota and Nebraska to Pennsylvania. The outbreak is best remembered for a slow-moving supercell complex that moved across Grand Island, Nebraska, spawning seven tornadoes, three of which were anticyclonic. The tornadoes also did not move in a straight line, with most looping back over their own path at least once. This part of the outbreak, which is also known as The Night of the Twisters, killed five and injured 200. Overall, the outbreak produced 29 tornadoes, killed six people and injured 413.

June 29

An F2 tornado in Harford County, Maryland moved onto the Aberdeen Proving Ground, injuring 10.

July
There were 95 tornadoes in the US in July.

July 8–12

A deadly outbreak sequence of 22 tornadoes tore through the Northern United States with July 9 producing an F4 tornado that killed two and injured 25 in Rushville, Indiana. Overall, two people were killed and 37 others were injured.

July 15–16

An intense weather system spawned a derecho that trigged the start of a two-day tornado outbreak from South Dakota to Pennsylvania, although it started with an F1 tornado in Florida. Three people were killed in separate tornadoes in Wisconsin on July 15, with tornadoes also injuring 27 others.

August
There were 73 tornadoes in the US in August.

September
There were 37 tornadoes in the US in September.

September 3

A small, but destructive outbreak of nine tornadoes hit the Mississippi Valley with a deadly F3 tornado striking Downtown St. Cloud, Minnesota, killing one and injuring 15.

October
There were 43 tornadoes in the US in October.

November
There were 3 tornadoes in the US in November.

December
There were 2 tornadoes in the US in December.

See also
 Tornado
 Tornadoes by year
 Tornado records
 Tornado climatology
 Tornado myths
 List of tornado outbreaks
 List of F5 and EF5 tornadoes
 List of North American tornadoes and tornado outbreaks
 List of 21st-century Canadian tornadoes and tornado outbreaks
 List of European tornadoes and tornado outbreaks
 List of tornadoes and tornado outbreaks in Asia
 List of Southern Hemisphere tornadoes and tornado outbreaks
 List of tornadoes striking downtown areas
 Tornado intensity
 Fujita scale
 Enhanced Fujita scale

References

External links
 U.S. tornadoes in 1980 – Tornado History Project
 Tornado deaths monthly

 
1980 meteorology
Tornado-related lists by year
Torn